Tony Gilkyson (born August 6, 1952) is a Los Angeles-based musician. He is the son of Jane Gilkyson and songwriter/folk musician Terry Gilkyson, as well as the brother of singer-songwriter Eliza Gilkyson.

Career
Gilkyson is a former member of Lone Justice and was a member of the band X from 1986 to 1995 where he replaced Billy Zoom after his departure and played on See How We Are and the albums that followed.

As a solo artist, he is known for his guitar work. He is also a record producer, having worked with Exene Cervenka, Eleni Mandell, Chuck E. Weiss and Dave Alvin.

Discography

References

External links
 
 

1952 births
Living people
American singer-songwriters
American male singer-songwriters
People from Hollywood, Los Angeles
X (American band) members